Drias, also referred to as Dryas, is a village in Kavala, Greece. The village takes its name after the mythological Greek nymphs Dryads.

Locations near Drias include the small villages of Paleochori (Kavala), and Antifilippi.

Kavala (regional unit)
Buildings and structures in Eastern Macedonia and Thrace